Bay L'Argent is a town in the Canadian province of Newfoundland and Labrador.

The ferry MV Terra Nova has a port in Bay L'Argent servicing the isolated outport of Rencontre East with another port in Pool's Cove, on the Connaigre Peninsula.

History 
In 2009, the Bay L'Argent town council made Newfoundland and Labrador history by electing the first ever all-female council.

Demographics 

See also
 Burin Peninsula
 List of cities and towns in Newfoundland and Labrador

References

Towns in Newfoundland and Labrador